Events from the year 1928 in art.

Events
 January 7 – The Tate Gallery, London, is one of the buildings flooded by the 1928 Thames flood.
 March 26 – The China Academy of Art is founded in Hangzhou (originally named the National Academy of Art).
 August – Ben Nicholson and Kit Wood visit St. Ives, Cornwall, and meet the ex-fisherman painter Alfred Wallis.
 October – English artist and designer Eric Gill moves with some of his artistic community from Capel-y-ffin in Wales to 'Pigotts' at Speen, Buckinghamshire, near High Wycombe.
 November 18 – Film debut of Mickey Mouse, designed by Ub Iwerks.
 Clarice Cliff introduces her Crocus pottery decoration.
 Pierre Chareau and colleagues begin construction of the Maison de Verre ("house of glass") on the rue Saint-Guillaume in Paris for client Jean Dalsace.
 Charles Haslewood Shannon suffers a fall while hanging a picture which ends his career as an artist.

Awards
 Archibald Prize: John Longstaff – Portrait of Dr Alexander Leeper
 Carnegie Prize – André Derain
 Art competitions at the 1928 Summer Olympics
 Painting: Isaac Israëls – Cavalier Rouge
 Drawing: Jean Jacoby – Rugby
 Graphic work: William Nicholson – An Almanac of Twelve Sports

Exhibitions
 Alexander Calder's first solo exhibition at the Weyhe Gallery, New York City.
 L'Exposition surréaliste at the Galerie du Sacre du Printemps, Paris.
 December – East London Group (as East London Art Club) exhibits at Whitechapel Gallery.

Works

 Wäinö Aaltonen – bust of Jean Sibelius
 Tarsila do Amaral – Abaporu
 Pierre Bonnard – Flowers on a Red Carpet
 John Steuart Curry
 Baptism in Kansas
 Bathers
 Charles Demuth – I Saw the Figure 5 in Gold
 Edwin Dickinson – The Fossil Hunters
 Otto Dix – Metropolis
 M. C. Escher – Tower of Babel (woodcut)
 Meredith Frampton – Marguerite Kelsey
 George Grosz – Hinterground (portfolio of lithographs)
 Edward Hopper
 From Williamsburg Bridge
 Manhattan Bridge Loop
 Night Windows
 Prudence Heward – Girl on a Hill
 Frida Kahlo – Dama de Blanco
 André Kertész – The Fork (photograph)
 Sir John Lavery – Portrait of Lady Lavery as Kathleen Ni Houlihan
 Tamara de Lempicka
 Andromeda
 Portrait of Dr. Boucard
 L. S. Lowry
 A Street Scene
 Going to the Match
 Eugenie McEvoy – Taxi! Taxi!
 René Magritte – The Empty Mask
 Henri Matisse – Odalisque au fauteuil turc
 Ivan Meštrović – The Bowman and The Spearman (equestrian sculptures, Chicago)
 Georgia O'Keeffe
 East River from the Shelton Hotel
 East River from the Thirtieth Story of the Shelton Hotel
 Mahmoud Mokhtar – Egypt's Renaissance (sculpture group, Cairo University, begun 1919, completed)
 Frederick Roth – Equestrian statue of George Washington (Morristown, New Jersey) (bronze)
 Frank O. Salisbury – Clarence Winthrop Bowen
 Christian Schad – Two Girlfriends
 Charles Sheeler – Upper Deck (photograph, approximate date)
 Zinaida Serebriakova – Lit By The Sun
 Charles Sims – I Am the Abyss and I Am Light
 John French Sloan – Sixth Avenue Elevated at Third Street
 Joseph Southall – The Botanists
 Alexej von Jawlensky – Abstract Head
 George Fite Waters – Statue of Abraham Lincoln (Portland, Oregon) (bronze)

Births

January to June
 20 January – Malang, Filipino artist (d. 2017)
 31 January – Dušan Džamonja, Macedonian sculptor
 1 March – Jacques Rivette, French filmmaker (d. 2016)
 3 March – Jean Rustin, French painter
 18 March – Mirka Mora, French-Australian artist and cultural figure (d. 2018)
 25 March – Hans Steinbrenner, German sculptor (d. 2008)
 25 April – Cy Twombly, American abstract artist (d. 2011)
 28 April – Yves Klein, French abstract artist (d. 1962)
 14 May – Władysław Hasior, Polish sculptor, painter and set designer (d. 1999)
 30 May – Pro Hart, Australian painter (d. 2006)
 3 June – Donald Judd, American sculptor (d. 1994)
 16 June – Pierrette Bloch, French-Swiss painter, textile artist (d. 2017)
 June 25
 Peyo, Belgian comics artist (d. 1992)
 Alex Toth, American comic book artist and cartoonist (d. 2006)

July to December
 July 8 – Pat Adams, American painter and printmaker
 July 10 – Bernard Buffet, French painter (d. 1999)
 July 14 – Anwar Shemza, Pakistan-born British artist and writer (d. 1985)
 July 21 – Anne Harris, Canadian sculptor
 August 6 – Andy Warhol, American artist, director and writer (d. 1987)
 August 12 – Charles Blackman, Australian painter and illustrator
 August 15 – Alan Collins, English figurative religious sculptor (d. 2016)
 August 22 – Roberto Aizenberg, Argentine painter and sculptor (d. 1996)
 August 31 – Jeremy Maas, English art dealer and historian of Victorian painting (d. 1997)
 September 9 – Sol LeWitt, American conceptual and minimalist artist (d. 2007)
 September 10 - Ward Jackson, American painter (d. 2004)
 September 12 – Robert Irwin, American installation artist
 September 13 – Robert Indiana, born Clark, American pop artist (d. 2018)
 October 7 – Sohrab Sepehri, Persian poet and painter (d. 1980)
 October 12 – Al Held, American Abstract expressionist painter (d. 2005)
 October 30 – Michael Andrews, English painter (d. 1995)
 November 3 – Osamu Tezuka, Japanese manga artist, animator and film producer (d. 1989)
 November 6 – Norman Carlberg, American sculptor (d. 2018)
 November 17 – Arman, French-born American artist (d. 2005)
 November 27 – Josh Kirby, English commercial artist (d. 2001)
 December 2 – Guy Bourdin, French photographer (d. 1991)
 December 12 – Helen Frankenthaler, American abstract expressionist painter (d. 2011)
 December 13 – Wolfgang Hutter, Austrian painter, lithographer and designer
 December 15 – Friedensreich Hundertwasser, Austrian painter, architect and sculptor (d. 2000)
 December 31 – Siné, French cartoonist (d. 2016)

Date unknown
 Franco the Great, American Street artist
 Lamidi Olonade Fakeye, Nigerian Yoruba sculptor (d. 2009)
 Wally Hedrick, American artist (d. 2003)
 Brian O'Doherty aka Patrick Ireland, Irish-born art critic and installation artist

Deaths
 January 4 – Hamilton Hamilton, American painter (b. 1847)
 January 6 – Adolfo de Carolis, Italian painter, xylographer, illustrator and photographer (b. 1874)
 January 8 – Gyula Basch, Hungarian painter (b. 1859)
 January 13 – Frederick Arthur Bridgman, American painter (b. 1847)
 January 21 – Nikolai Astrup, Norwegian painter (b. 1880)
 January 26 – Henrietta Rae, English painter (b. 1859)
 February 7 – Adolfo de Carolis, Italian painter (b. 1874)
 February 12 – Nicolás Guzmán Bustamante, Chilean painter and draftsman (b. 1850)
 March 31 – Medardo Rosso, Italian sculptor (b. 1858)
 April 3 – Raffaello Romanelli, Italian sculptor (b. 1856)
 April 5 – Viktor Oliva, Czech painter and illustrator (b. 1861)
 April 13 – Charles Sims, English painter (suicide, b. 1873)
 May 16 – Frederick Arthur Verner, Canadian landscape painter (b. 1836)
 May 21 - George Frampton, English artist (b. 1860)
 June 22 – A. B. Frost, American illustrator (b. 1851)
 July 10 – John Chambers, English landscape and portrait painter (b. 1852)
 July 25 – Jane Sutherland, Australian landscape painter (b. 1853)
 August 30 – Franz Stuck, German symbolist /Art Nouveau painter, sculptor, engraver and architect (b. 1863)
 September 20 – Ivan Tišov, Croatian painter (b. 1870)
 October 24 – Arthur Bowen Davies, American artist (b. 1863)
 October 30 – Percy Anderson, English stage designer and painter (b. 1851)
 November 15 – Godfred Christensen, Danish painter (b. 1845)
 December 1 – Leopold Graf von Kalckreuth, German painter (b. 1855)
 December 2 – Robert Reid, American Impressionist painter (b. 1862)
 December 10 – Charles Rennie Mackintosh, Scottish architect and designer (b. 1868)
 December 15 – Louis Mathieu Verdilhan, French painter (b. 1875)
 December 18 – Nils Bergslien, Norwegian illustrator, painter and sculptor (b. 1853)

See also
 1928 in fine arts of the Soviet Union

References

 
Years of the 20th century in art
1920s in art